Humphrey Hopper (1767–1844) was an English sculptor and stonemason. He was given the government commission for the memorial in St Paul's Cathedral to General Andrew Hay.

Life
He was born in Wolsingham in County Durham in 1765 the son of Humprey and Margaret Hopper. He moved to 55 Paddington Street in London in 1799.

Hopper studied in the Royal Academy Schools during his thirties, from 1801, already having exhibited at the Royal Academy from 1799. He gained the siver medal there in 1802 and the gold medal there in 1803, for an original group of The Death of Meleager.

In 1807 Hay was a competitor for the Pitt and Nelson memorials in the London Guildhall. He developed a line of plaster figures designed to hold lamps, working with architects who designed niches for them, such as Lewis Wyatt. He lived in the Marylebone area of London, settling in Wigmore Street.

Hopper died on 27 May 1844 at 13 Wigmore Street, off Cavendish Square in Marylebone, London. He is buried in Kensal Green Cemetery.

Works

Hopper executed some classical figures, but in later life concentrated on work as a monumental mason, including memorial busts. and monuments. Monuments included those to:

 Lady Tynte (1800) at Addington, Buckinghamshire
 General Andrew Hay (1814) in St Paul's Cathedral
 Josiah Spode II (1827) in Stoke-on-Trent Parish Church
 Sir William Curtis, 1st Baronet (1829) in Ramsgate in Kent
 Admiral Eliab Harvey (1830) in Hempsted, Essex
 John Henry North (1831) in Harrow Parish Church 
 Robert Hooper (1835) in Shoreham-by-Sea
 Admiral Richard Spry (1835) in St anthony's on Roseland, Cornwall
 Sir William Coles Medlycott, 1st Baronet (1835) in Milborne Port
 Elizabeth Tynte (1836) at Goathurst
 Admiral Sir John Hood (1838) Marylebone Parish Church
 Sir Frederick Grey-Cooper (1842) at Corfe

The public monument to Major-General Hay in St Paul's Cathedral was criticised, in particular by George Lewis Smyth (1800–1853) who objected to the nakedness of the figure of Hercules poised to catch the falling Hay. From 1815 Hopper exhibited a series of busts at the Royal Academy, showing for the last time there in 1834.

Notes

External links

Attribution

1844 deaths
English stonemasons
English sculptors
Year of birth uncertain
Burials at Kensal Green Cemetery
People from Wolsingham